Tuolumne City is an unincorporated town in Tuolumne County, California. A census-designated place (CDP) officially known as Tuolumne also encompasses the town. The population of the CDP was 1,779 at the 2010 census, down from 1,865 at the 2000 census.

History
The area is known for a history of logging operations. Remnants of logging railroads are still present in the area.

In the 1970s, Herbert Reichhold planned to open a theme park using narrow gauge live steam railroad equipment left over from the commercial logging operations. He envisioned transforming the town of Tuolumne into a "Railroad Theme Park", and he began purchasing properties in the town. However he abandoned the plans after the death of his wife.

In the late 1970s, Glen Bell, the founder of the Taco Bell chain, opened the "Westside and Cherry Valley Railroad" in Tuolumne. This ran for about 5 miles from the old lumber mill in the town, into the mountains. It used the track and several  gauge locomotives from the logging company. This tourist attraction lasted for several years, but closed in the mid 80s.

Communications and facilities 
Unlike the rest of Tuolumne County, Tuolumne was not in the Bell System/SBC service area. Tuolumne Telephone Company provided service to this area. Wired telephone numbers in the Tuolumne Central Office follow the pattern (209) 928-xxxx. Tuolumne Telephone is now part of Citizens Telecommunications Company of California, a subsidiary of Frontier Communications.

There are three schools:  Summerville Elementary with grades K-8, Mother Lode Christian School with grades K-12, and Summerville Union High School with grades 9-12.  Summerville High School also hosts Tuolumne County's Connections Arts School for grades 7-12.

A logging company town, Tuolumne experienced an economic downturn when the West Side Lumber Company mill closed.  For many years the community has struggled to create a new economic base.

The Tuolumne Band of Me-Wuk Indians, a federally recognized tribe, is headquartered in Tuolumne.<ref>[http://www.ncai.org/tribal-directory?letter=T "Tribal Directory.] National Congress of American Indians. Retrieved 1 June 2012.</ref> In recent years, the tribe has contributed new growth with revenues from nearby Black Oak Casino, which is owned and operated by the Tuolumne Band. A new medical clinic and a new library are a few recent improvements. Another addition has been the renovation of the Tuolumne City Memorial Museum on Carter Street.

Once known as the two towns of "Summersville" in the south and "Carter" in the north, Tuolumne has incorporated them both into one town.  A new municipal advisory council has been established to help with this revival.

Tuolumne is also the birthplace of the Vaudevillian performer and hipster comedian Lord Buckley, born Richard Myrle Buckley, April 5, 1906, died November 12, 1960.

Geography
Tuolumne is located at  (37.961785, -120.236851).

Demographics

2010
At the 2010 census Tuolumne had a population of 1,779. The racial makeup of Tuolumne was 1,547 (87.0%) White, 13 (0.7%) African American, 83 (4.7%) Native American, 12 (0.7%) Asian, 1 (0.1%) Pacific Islander, 50 (2.8%) from other races, and 73 (4.1%) from two or more races. Hispanic or Latino of any race were 206 people (11.6%).

The census reported that 1,768 people (99.4% of the population) lived in households, 11 (0.6%) lived in non-institutionalized group quarters, and no one was institutionalized.

There were 758 households, 223 (29.4%) had children under the age of 18 living in them, 297 (39.2%) were opposite-sex married couples living together, 95 (12.5%) had a female householder with no husband present, 52 (6.9%) had a male householder with no wife present.  There were 70 (9.2%) unmarried opposite-sex partnerships, and 6 (0.8%) same-sex married couples or partnerships. 239 households (31.5%) were one person and 107 (14.1%) had someone living alone who was 65 or older. The average household size was 2.33.  There were 444 families (58.6% of households); the average family size was 2.93.

The age distribution was 397 people (22.3%) under the age of 18, 161 people (9.1%) aged 18 to 24, 411 people (23.1%) aged 25 to 44, 510 people (28.7%) aged 45 to 64, and 300 people (16.9%) who were 65 or older.  The median age was 41.4 years. For every 100 females, there were 91.3 males.  For every 100 females age 18 and over, there were 87.5 males.

There were 840 housing units at an average density of 355.6 per square mile, of the occupied units 396 (52.2%) were owner-occupied and 362 (47.8%) were rented. The homeowner vacancy rate was 3.6%; the rental vacancy rate was 4.7%.  987 people (55.5% of the population) lived in owner-occupied housing units and 781 people (43.9%) lived in rental housing units.

2000
At the 2000 census there were 1,865 people, 736 households, and 474 families in the CDP. The racial makeup of the CDP was 89.01% White, 0.38% African American, 4.29% Native American, 0.21% Asian, 0.54% Pacific Islander, 1.82% from other races, and 3.75% from two or more races. Hispanic or Latino of any race were 6.97%.

Of the 736 households 31.3% had children under the age of 18 living with them, 45.7% were married couples living together, 15.4% had a female householder with no husband present, and 35.5% were non-families. 29.2% of households were one person and 13.3% were one person aged 65 or older.  The average household size was 2.51 and the average family size was 3.10.

The age distribution was 28.3% under the age of 18, 8.1% from 18 to 24, 26.5% from 25 to 44, 23.5% from 45 to 64, and 13.6% 65 or older.  The median age was 37 years. For every 100 females, there were 93.3 males.  For every 100 females age 18 and over, there were 87.5 males.

The median household income was $32,361 and the median family income  was $41,007. Males had a median income of $35,524 versus $22,593 for females. The per capita income for the CDP was $16,567.  About 13.0% of families and 14.2% of the population were below the poverty line, including 11.3% of those under age 18 and 13.4% of those age 65 or over.

Government

Notable natives
 Bobby Adams, Major League Baseball player, was born in Tuolumme.
 Lord Buckley was born in Tuolumne and worked there as a logger.

In popular culture
In 1951, scenes of the western High Noon, starring Gary Cooper, were filmed in Tuolumne. Cooper's Will Kane went to St. Joseph's Church to solicit help from the townspeople.

California Historical Landmark
Summersville is a California Historical Landmark.
California Historical Landmark number 407 reads:NO. 407 SUMMERSVILLE (TUOLUMNE) - The area's first non-Indian settlers, the Franklin Summers family, arrived in 1854 and built a log cabin a half mile west of this spot, the geographical center of East Belt Placer Gold Rush from 1856 to 1857. In 1858, James Blakely discovered the first quartz lode half a mile east of here and named it 'Eureka.' The mine became the nucleus of the town of Summersville, which was later called Carters and finally became Tuolumne. Other mining towns lively in gold rush days were Long Gulch, two miles south, and Cherokee, two miles north. ''

See also
California Historical Landmarks in Tuolumne County, California

References

 

Census-designated places in Tuolumne County, California
Populated places in the Sierra Nevada (United States)